William Muller may refer to:
 William H. Muller Jr., American cardiologist
 William Grenfell Max Muller, British diplomat
 William James Müller, also spelt Muller, British landscape and figure painter
 Bill Muller, American journalist and film critic

See also
 Wilhelm Müller (disambiguation)